The Defenders is an American courtroom drama series that ran on CBS from 1961 to 1965. It was created by television writer Reginald Rose, and stars E. G. Marshall and Robert Reed as father-and-son defense attorneys. Original music for the series was scored by Frank Lewin and Leonard Rosenman. This series is not related to the 2010s CBS series of the same name.

Plot
Lawrence Preston (Marshall) and Kenneth Preston (Reed) are father-and-son defense attorneys who specialized in legally complex cases, with defendants such as neo-Nazis, conscientious objectors, demonstrators of the Civil Rights Movement, a schoolteacher fired for being an atheist, an author accused of pornography, and a physician charged in a mercy killing.

Cast

E. G. Marshall as Lawrence Preston
Robert Reed as Kenneth Preston
Polly Rowles as Helen Donaldson, the Prestons' secretary (1961–1962)
Joan Hackett as Joan Miller, Kenneth's girlfriend (1961–1962)

Several actors appeared numerous times over the course of the series. John Boruff, J.D. Cannon, Lonnie Chapman and Ossie Davis each appeared in eight episodes; Walter Klavun appeared in seven episodes; Marc Connelly, Robert Gerringer, Murray Hamilton, Judson Laire, Kermit Murdock, Frank Overton, Lester Rawlins and Dolph Sweet each appeared six times; and Simon Oakland and William Shatner each appeared in five episodes.

Episodes

Production

Development
The series was a slight reworking of Rose's 1957 two-part drama, The Defender, from the anthology series Studio One.  In the original program, Ralph Bellamy played the father and William Shatner played his son.  Shatner guest-starred in various roles in the later series, and the original drama later was incorporated into an episode of his series, Boston Legal.

According to creator Reginald Rose, "the law is the subject of our programs: not crime, not mystery, not the courtroom for its own sake. We were never interested in producing a 'who-done-it' which simply happened to be resolved each week in a flashy courtroom battle of wits." And unlike Perry Mason, which also ran on CBS, victory was "far from certain on The Defenders—as were morality and justice."

Topics featured in the series included abortion, capital punishment, "no-knock" searches, custody rights of adoptive parents, the insanity defense, the "poisoned fruit doctrine," immigration quotas, the Hollywood blacklist, jury nullification, and Cold War visa restrictions.

Writers for the show included Rose in many early episodes, with later episodes by Albert "Al" Ruben and Ernest Kinoy – both Jewish Americans holding socially liberal views. It was thought the move to “ratings graveyard” Thursday nights after a successful  prime time reign on Saturday evenings, was conservative corporate devised to force the socially conscious program into cancellation, which it ultimately  did.

Controversial episodes
A 1962 episode entitled "The Benefactor"—in which the father–son legal team defended an abortion care provider—was the most controversial; all of the series' three regular advertisers (Brown & Williamson, Lever Brothers, and Kimberly-Clark) refused to sponsor the episode, so it was only transmitted after a last-minute sponsor was found, [Speidel Watches], for a discounted advertising rate. The Canadian Broadcasting Corporation banned this episode when it was first shown on April 28. In 2008, this incident was used as the basis for a second season episode of the drama Mad Men, set in the 1960s.

The December 7, 1963 episode, "Climate of Evil," was originally titled "The Gentle Assassin" but was changed two weeks earlier in the aftermath of the John F. Kennedy assassination. In addition, the January 4, 1964 episode, "Clare Cheval Died in Boston," was originally scheduled for the weekend of the assassination, and subsequently had reference to "President Kennedy" deleted from the episode.

Broadcast history
Note: The most frequent time slot for the series is in bold text.

 Saturday at 8:30–9:30 p.m. on CBS: September 16, 1961 – May 25, 1963; November 30, 1963 – June 27, 1964
 Saturday at 9:00–10:00 p.m. on CBS: September 28 – November 16, 1963
 Thursday at 10:00–11:00 p.m. on CBS: September 24, 1964 – May 13, 1965

Reception

Awards
The Defenders won 13 Emmy Awards (including three in a row for Outstanding Drama Series) and received an additional seven nominations.

The Museum of Broadcast Communications called it "perhaps the most socially conscious series the medium has ever seen", a show "singularly resonant with New Frontier liberalism".

In 2002, The Defenders was ranked #31 on TV Guide's 50 Greatest TV Shows of All Time, and in 2013 TV Guide ranked it #8 in its list of The 60 Greatest Dramas of All Time.

Ratings
 1961–1962: #26 (22.4)
 1962–1963: #18 (23.9)
 1963–1964: N/A
 1964–1965: N/A

As a top 30 series, The Defenders has an average rating of 23.2.

Home media
On July 12, 2016, Shout! Factory released the complete first season on DVD in Region 1.

Sequel and spin-offs

A re-envisioned version of the series debuted on the Showtime network in 1997.  Still called The Defenders, it featured E. G. Marshall in his original role as Lawrence Preston. However, the three Showtime films focused on Beau Bridges as Don Preston, a previously unmentioned second son of Lawrence, and Martha Plimpton as M.J., the daughter of Ken Preston, Robert Reed's character, who is said to have died (as had Reed in 1992). Don and M.J. worked as lawyers and carried on the family legacy. However, Marshall died after completion of the second episode ("Choice of Evils").  Production was halted and the remaining episode, "Taking the First", aired as a movie special in 1998.

References in other media

The second season of Mad Men contains an episode named "The Benefactor" that featured a brief clip from The Defenders episode of the same name. In the Mad Men episode, the Sterling Cooper advertising agency is trying to secure sponsors for The Defenders episode, which contains a plot involving abortion (originally telecast on April 28, 1962), after the regular sponsors pulled out because they claimed the episode (and subject matter) was too controversial. The episode also offers a fictional backstory for the episode; that it was written for the third season of the series but rejected by the network for the usage of abortion as a plotline. The following season, the writers produced a script that revolved around the theme of cannibalism but the episode was rejected by the director who was assigned to film the episode due to the content. The director's refusal led to the network being forced to film the abortion-centric script, which an executive assigned to find advertisers for the show proclaims was the plan all along.

References

External links
 
 Finding aid to The Defenders scripts and papers at Columbia University. Rare Book & Manuscript Library.

1961 American television series debuts
1965 American television series endings
1960s American drama television series
1960s American legal television series
American legal drama television series
Black-and-white American television shows
Television shows filmed in New York City
CBS original programming
Courtroom drama television series
English-language television shows
Television series by CBS Studios
Primetime Emmy Award for Outstanding Drama Series winners